In process improvement efforts, defects per million opportunities or DPMO (or nonconformities per million opportunities (NPMO)) is a measure of process performance.  It is defined as

A defect can be defined as a nonconformance of a quality characteristic (e.g. strength, width, response time) to its specification.  DPMO is stated in opportunities per million units for convenience:  Processes that are considered highly capable (e.g., processes of Six Sigma quality) are those that experience fewer than 3.4 defects per million opportunities (or services provided).

Note that DPMO differs from reporting defective parts per million (PPM) in that it comprehends the possibility that a unit under inspection may be found to have multiple defects of the same type or may have multiple types of defects.  Identifying specific opportunities for defects (and therefore how to count and categorize defects) is an art, but generally organizations consider the following when defining the number of opportunities per unit:
Knowledge of the process under study
Industry standards
When studying multiple types of defects, knowledge of the relative importance of each defect type in determining customer satisfaction
The time, effort, and cost to count and categorize defects in process output

Other measures  
Other measures of process performance include:
Process capability indices such as Cpk 
Natural tolerance limit or sigma level
PPM defective or defective parts per million
Process performance indices such as Ppk
Quality costs or cost of poor quality (COPQ)

References

Further reading

 
 
 
 Hahn, G. J., Hill, W. J., Hoerl, R. W. and Zinkgraf, S. A. (1999) The Impact of Six Sigma Improvement-A Glimpse into the Future of Statistics, The American Statistician, Vol. 53, No. 3, pp. 208–215.
 
 
 
 
 
 

Statistical process control
Six Sigma